Hawqa ( known also as Haouqa or Hawka, Arabic:  حوقا ) is a village in the Zgharta District in the North Governorate of Lebanon. It is in the valley of Qozhaya, the northern branch of the Valley of Qadisha.

External links
Ehden Family Tree

Populated places in the North Governorate
Zgharta District